This page details statistics of the Basketball Champions League. Unless notified these statistics concern all seasons since inception of the Champions League in the 2016–17 season, including qualifying rounds of the Basketball Champions League as per "Competition facts"; all matches before regular season count as "qualifying matches".

General performances

By club

By nation

All-time top-25 Basketball Champions League ranking

Number of participating clubs in the Basketball Champions League
The following is a list of clubs that have played in or qualified for the Champions League group stage.

Bold: club advanced to the play-offs of a particular season.

Clubs

Performance review

Classification

Performance

By Final Four appearances

By club

By nation

Game records

Biggest wins
The largest overall difference in a match is +59, by Canarias against Opava (97–38) in the regular season 2018–19
The largest difference in qualifying rounds is +43:
Riesen Ludwigsburg beat Bosna 59–102 (+43) in 2017–18
Nizhny Novgorod beat Porto 92–49 (+43) in 2018–19
Kataja beat Södertälje Kings 97–58 (+39) in 2016–17
Fribourg Olympic beat Inter Bratislava 89–50 (+39) in 2019–20
Aris beat Dinamo Tbilisi 92–54 (+38) in 2018–19

The following teams won a single match by 45 points or more in the regular season of the Basketball Champions League:
PAOK beat Opava 93–43 (+50) in 2018–19
Canarias beat Orlandina 59–106 (+47) in 2017–18
Nanterre 92 beat Bonn 103–56 (+47) in 2018–19
Canarias beat Mornar 103–57 (+46) in 2016–17
Nanterre 92 beat Opava 110–64 (+46) in 2018–19

The following teams won a single match by 20 points or more in the playoffs of the Basketball Champions League:
Monaco beat Zielona Góra 90–60 (+30) in 2017–18
Canarias beat PAOK 80–54 (+26) in 2016–17
Riesen Ludwigsburg beat Oldenburg 63–88 (+25) in 2017–18
Dinamo Sassari beat Nymburk 94–72 (+22) in 2016–17
Monaco beat Riesen Ludwigsburg 65–87 (+22) in 2017–18, the largest difference in a Final Four
AEK beat Juventus 75–54 (+21) in 2016–17
Nymburk beat Dinamo Sassari 84–63 (+21) in 2016–17
Karşıyaka beat Skyliners Frankfurt 72–52 (+20) in 2016–17

Biggest two leg wins
Nanterre 92 holds the overall record by beating Karhu 182–112 (+70) in the qualifying round in 2018–19. They beat the Finns by 54–91 and 91–58
Riesen Ludwigsburg has the second overall record by beating Bosna 187–118 (+69) in the qualifying round in 2017–18. They beat the Bosnians by 59–85 and 102–59
Aris has the third record by beating Dinamo Tbilisi 182–118 (+64) in the qualifying round in 2018–19. They beat the Georgians by 64–90 and 92–54
As for the regular season, record belongs to Canarias, who beat Orlandina 194–106 (+88, 88–47 at home, 59–106 away) in 2017–18
Monaco holds the biggest margin of overall home and away result in the Basketball Champions League era in playoffs. They beat Zielona Góra 174–142 (+32, 82–84 win away, 90–60, win at home) in the round of 16 in 2017–18

Most overtimes in a match
Two matches were decided after playing three overtimes:
Radom beat PAOK 93–85 (6–6, 8–8, 14–6) in 2016–17
Reyer Venezia beat Bandırma 108–101 (11–11, 4–4, 13–6) in 2017–18

Highest scorings
Nine teams scored more than 110 points in a game:
Hapoel Holon scored 122 points against Toruń (105–122) in the regular season in 2019–20
Manresa scored 121 points against Toruń (102–121) in the regular season in 2019–20
Bonn scored 114 points against Opava (114–77) in the regular season in 2018–19
Neptūnas scored 114 points against Gaziantep (114–73) in the regular season in 2017–18
Avtodor scored 113 points against Kataja (113–84) in the regular season in 2016–17
Dinamo Sassari scored 113 points against Toruń (95–113) in the regular season in 2019–20
Hapoel Jerusalem scored 112 points against Włocławek (112–94) in the regular season in 2019–20
Reyer Venezia scored 111 points against Hapoel Holon (111–104) in the regular season in 2018–19
Hapoel Jerusalem scored 111 points against Nymburk (80–111) in the regular season in 2018–19

Lowest scorings
Seven teams scored less than 50 points in a match:
Opava scored 38 points against Canarias (97–38) in the regular season in 2018–19. This is the overall record for all Basketball Champions League matches
Skyliners Frankfurt scored 47 points against Monaco (65–47) in the regular season in 2017–18
Orlandina scored 47 points against Canarias (88–47) in the regular season in 2017–18
Riesen Ludwigsburg scored 47 points against Murcia (63–47) in the regular season in 2018–19
Bandırma scored 48 points against Radom (49–48) in the regular season in 2017–18
Felice Scandone scored 49 points against Reyer Venezia (53–49) in the round of 16 in 2016–17. This is the overall record for the Basketball Champions League playoffs
Falco scored 49 points against Beşiktaş (74–49) in the regular season in 2019–20.

Most points in a match
In ten matches, the overall scoring was more than 200 points:
Hapoel Holon beat 105–122 (227 points) Toruń in the regular season in 2019–20. This is the overall record for all Basketball Champions League matches.
Manresa beat 102–121 (223 points) Toruń in the regular season in 2019–20.
Reyer Venezia beat 111–104 (215 points) Hapoel Holon in the regular season in 2018–19.
Reyer Venezia beat 108–101 (209 points) Bandırma in the regular season in 2017–18.
Nanterre 92 beat 102–106 (208 points) Felice Scandone in the regular season in 2017–18.
Dinamo Sassari beat 95–113 (208 points) Toruń in the regular season in 2019–20
Felice Scandone beat 105–102 (207 points) Włocławek in the regular season in 2018–19.
Hapoel Jerusalem beat 112–94 (206 points) Włocławek in the regular season in 2019–20
AEK beat 101–103 (204 points) Reyer Venezia in the regular season in 2017–18.
Nymburk beat Bonn by 106–98 (204 points) in the regular season in 2017–18. This is the overall record of a match without overtimes in all Basketball Champions League matches.
AEK beat 94–100 (194 points) Monaco Basket in the final in 2017–18. This is the overall record for the Basketball Champions League playoffs
Antwerp Giants beat 100–94 (194 points) Cantù in the qualifying round in 2018–19. This is the overall record for the Basketball Champions League qualifying rounds

Less points in a match
Radom beat 49–48 (97 points) Bandırma in the regular season in 2017–18. This is the overall record for all the Basketball Champions League matches
Reyer Venezia beat 53–49 (102 points) Felice Scandone in the round of 16 in 2016–17. This is the overall record for the Basketball Champions League playoffs
Tsmoki-Minsk beat 50–57 (107 points) Prishtina in the qualifying round in 2017–18. This is the overall record for the Basketball Champions League qualifying rounds

Comeback
Only two teams have lost the first leg of a playoffs or qualifying round match with ten or more points, but still managed to qualify for the next round:
Karşıyaka lost by 10 (90–80) against Skyliners Frankfurt in the playoffs qualifiers 2016–17, but won by 20 (72–52) in the second leg and 152–142 on aggregate
AEK lost by 10 (88–98) against Nymburk in the round of 16 2017–18, but won by 11 (82–93) in the second leg and 181–180 on aggregate
In the qualifying rounds, Donar lost by 20 (84–64) against Prishtina in the first leg, but won by 25 (80–55) in the second leg and 144–139 in the aggregate.

Countries
4 meetings between teams from the same country have been played:
2 meetings from the German league:
 2017–18 Oldenburg–Riesen Ludwigsburg, round of 16, 149–162 (63–88, 86–74)
 2017–18 Riesen Ludwigsburg–Bayreuth, quarterfinals, 170–163 (81–86, 89–77)
1 meeting from the Turkish league:
 2016–17 Karşıyaka–Beşiktaş, round of 16, 165–153 (75–70, 90–83)
1 meeting from the Spanish league:
 2017–18 Murcia–Canarias, round of 16, 149–143 (66–71, 83–72)

Specific regular season records

14 wins
No team won all the 14 matches of the regular season. Monaco won 13 in 2017–18 and Murcia in 2018–19.

14 losses
No team ended the regular season without wins. However, three teams ended with only one win and 13 losses:
Bakken Bears in 2016–17
Olimpija in 2018–19
VEF Rīga 2019–20

6 wins
Only one team has won all 6 matches of the regular season:
Bamberg in 2020–21

6 losses
Three teams have ended the regular season with no wins and 6 losses:
Keravnos in 2020–21
Start Lublin in 2020–21
Fortitudo Bologna in 2020–21

Biggest disparity between group winner and runner-up
The biggest wins difference between the first- and second-placed teams in a Champions League regular season is four wins, achieved by Murcia, 13 wins (+135) in 2018–19 (2nd Bandırma 9 wins, +76).

Fewest wins achieved, yet won the group
Le Mans Sarthe, 9 wins in 2016–17.
Strasbourg, 9 wins in 2017–18.

Most wins achieved, yet knocked out
Estudiantes, 8 wins in 2017–18.
Reyer Venezia, 8 wins in 2017–18.
SIG Strasbourg, 8 wins in 2018–19.

Most wins achieved in the group stage, not winning the group
Riesen Ludwigsburg, 12 wins in 2017–18 (ranked second)
Hapoel Jerusalem, 12 wins in 2018–19 (ranked second)

Fewest wins achieved, yet advanced
Zielona Góra, 6 wins in 2017–18 (ranked fourth)

Qualifying from first qualifying round
Only three teams have negotiated all the rounds of qualification and reached the Champions League regular season:
Oradea in 2016–17 (two rounds)
Riesen Ludwigsburg in 2017–18 (three rounds)
Riesen Ludwigsburg went on to become the first team in the history of the competition to reach the playoffs and the Final Four from the first qualifying round.
Fribourg Olympic in 2018–19 (three rounds)

Consecutive wins
Monaco holds the record of 14 consecutive wins in the Champions League. Its run started in the 2016–17 third place game and ended in the 2017–18 round 14.

Consecutive home wins
Monaco holds the record with 17 consecutive home wins in the Champions League. Its run started in the 2016–17 regular season first round and ended in the 2017–18 quarterfinals second leg.

Consecutive away wins
Monaco holds the record with 7 consecutive away wins in the Champions League. Its run started in the 2016–17 quarterfinals first leg and ended in the 2017–18 regular season round 14.

Consecutive losses
Radom holds the record of 13 consecutive losses between the 2016–17 regular season round 4 and the 2017–18 regular season round 2.
Opava has the record in an only season, from the 2018–19 regular season round 2 to the round 13.

Players

Games played

Players with most games played

The table below does not include games played in the qualifying rounds of the competition.

Bold indicates players competing in the 2022–23 Basketball Champions League while indicates also player's current club.

Scoring leaders

All-time top scorers

The table below does not include points scored in the qualifying rounds of the competition.

Bold indicates players competing in the 2022–23 Basketball Champions League while indicates also player's current club.

Game highs

Rebounding leaders

All-time top rebounders

The table below does not include rebounds collected in the qualifying rounds of the competition.

Bold indicates players competing in the 2022–23 Basketball Champions League while indicates also player's current club.

{| class="wikitable" width="900"
!
!Player
!Rebounds
!Games
!Ratio
!Seasons
!width=400|Clubs
|-
| align="right" |1
| bgcolor="#CFECEC"| Miro Bilan
| align="center" |382
| align="center" |65
| align="center" |5.87
| align="center" |5
|SIG Strasbourg, Dinamo Sassari, Prometey, Peristeri
|-
| align="right" |2
| bgcolor="#CFECEC"| Tim Abromaitis
| align="center" |373
| align="center" |78
| align="center" |4.78
| align="center" |5
|Tenerife, Unicaja Malaga|-
| align="right" |3
| bgcolor="#CFECEC"| Petr Benda| align="center" |359
| align="center" |86
| align="center" |4.17
| align="center" |7
|Nymburk|-
| align="right" |4
| bgcolor="#CFECEC"| Giorgi Shermadini| align="center" |332
| align="center" |56
| align="center" |5.92
| align="center" |4
|Tenerife|-
| align="right" |5
| Vojtěch Hruban
| align="center" |319
| align="center" |79
| align="center" |4.03
| align="center" |6
|Nymburk
|-
| align="right" |6
| TaShawn Thomas
| align="center" |317
| align="center" |52
| align="center" |6.09
| align="center" |4
|Hapoel Holon, Hapoel Jerusalem
|-
| align="right" |7
| Jerai Grant
| align="center" |296
| align="center" |48
| align="center" |6.16
| align="center" |4
|Neptūnas, SIG Strasbourg, AEK
|-
| align="right" |8
| D. J. Kennedy
| align="center" |287
| align="center" |42
| align="center" |6.83
| align="center" |3
|Karşıyaka, Prometey
|-
| rowspan=2 align="right" |9
| Gašper Vidmar
| rowspan=2 align="center" |285
| align="center" |54
| align="center" |5.27
| align="center" |3
|Bandırma, Reyer Venezia
|-
| Suleiman Braimoh
| align="center" |54
| align="center" |5.27
| align="center" |5
|Enisey, Hapoel Jerusalem, San Pablo Burgos, Tofaş
|-
|}

Game highs

Assisting leaders
All-time top in assists

The table below does not include assists given in the qualifying rounds of the competition.Bold indicates players competing in the 2022–23 Basketball Champions League while indicates also player's current club.

Game highs

Stealing leaders
All-time top in steals

The table below does not include steals made in the qualifying rounds of the competition.Bold indicates players competing in the 2022–23 Basketball Champions League while indicates also player's current club.

Game highs

(q) indicates that achievement took place in qualification rounds

Blocking leaders
All-time top in blocks

The table below does not include blocks made in the qualifying rounds of the competition.Bold indicates players competing in the 2022–23 Basketball Champions League while indicates also player's current club.

Game highs

3 Pointers leaders
All-time 3 pointers made

The table below does not include 3 pointers made in the qualifying rounds of the competition.Bold indicates players competing in the 2022-23 Basketball Champions League while indicates also player's current club.

Game highs

(q''') indicates that achievement took place in qualification rounds

References

Statistics
Basketball statistics